John Dove Isaacs III (March 28, 1913 – June 6, 1980) was an American engineer and oceanographer.

He became full professor at the University of California, San Diego, which honored him posthumously by creating the John Dove Isaacs Chair in Natural Philosophy. 
Isaacs Hall at Scripps Institution of Oceanography was named to honor him.

He was honored by being elected to the American Geophysical Union, the National Academy of Sciences, the National Academy of Engineering, and the American Academy of Arts and Sciences.

References

https://web.archive.org/web/20110308032222/http://www-csgc.ucsd.edu/EDUCATION/IsaacsBio.html

External links
Willard Bascom, "John Dove Isaacs III", Biographical Memoirs of the National Academy of Sciences (1987) 

1913 births
1980 deaths
University of San Diego alumni
Engineers from California
University of California, San Diego faculty
Members of the United States National Academy of Sciences
Members of the United States National Academy of Engineering
American oceanographers
20th-century American engineers